She Gets Her Man may refer to:
 She Gets Her Man (1935 film), an American comedy film
 She Gets Her Man (1945 film), an American comedy film